Selección de Osa is a Costa Rican football club, currently playing in the Tercera Division.

They are based in the south of the country, in Ciudad Cortés, near the Panamanian border.

History
Founded in June 1983 as Deportivo Hospital Tomás Casas, the name was changed to Municipal Osa quickly. They won promotion to the Segunda División in 1996 and reached the top flight after 4 more years. They won promotion after beating Municipal Liberia in a championship playoff. It was the same Liberia team that beat Osa in May 2003 to send them down to the Segunda División again.

They spent a total of 3 seasons in the Primera División.

Honours

National
Segunda División de Costa Rica: 1
 2000

Current squad
As of June 2, 2022

References

Football clubs in Costa Rica
Association football clubs established in 1983
1983 establishments in Costa Rica